Dhoke Ajri is a village in Chakwal District, Punjab, Pakistan. It is about 20 km from Chakwal city on the Chowa Syden Shah Road. It is part of Jaswal Union Council.

Dhoke Ajri has basic amenities such as gas, electricity, telephones, roads, and primary schools for boys and girls.

References

Chakwal District
Populated places in Chakwal District